Progrypomyia is a genus of flies in the family Stratiomyidae.

Species
Progrypomyia nigra Lindner, 1949

Distribution
Brazil.

References

Stratiomyidae
Brachycera genera
Taxa named by Erwin Lindner
Diptera of South America
Endemic fauna of Brazil